Broad Mountain or Broad Ridge in the Ridge-and-Valley Appalachians in Carbon County and Schuylkill County in Eastern Pennsylvania is a steep-faced, anthracite-bearing barrier ridge just south of both Beaver Meadows and Weatherly, north of Nesquehoning and west and south of the Lehigh River basin west of the southwest border of the Poconos. The mountain ridge line is mostly flat and looks very similar to the man-made piles of culm in the region from the roads and towns looking up.

Geography
The long ridge has several peaks and the WSW peak in Schuylkill County is just  short of the summit altitude of the Carbon County peak. The WSW section also continues an important watershed terrain separating the waters of the Schuylkill basin from those of the Lehigh River, which receives the majority of outflow. Broad Ridge and Nesquehoning Ridge are joined together at elevation at the location of Hometown, Pennsylvania through which an important railroad line and PA Route 54 climb from Nesquehoning, nestled into a notch around the ridge's southern face. 

Oriented East-West and flanked in its south by Nesquehoning Creek, the ridgeline extends  from the right bank of the Lehigh Gorge to the left bank of the Little Schuylkill River near the railroad junctions at Hometown and Delano.

See also
 Blue Mountain Geology
 Lausanne Landing
 Lehigh-Susquehanna Turnpike
 Penn Haven Junction

Footnotes

References
 

Ridges of Pennsylvania
Ridges of Carbon County, Pennsylvania